Pierre-Marie Gerlier (14 January 1880 – 17 January 1965) was a French Cardinal of the Roman Catholic Church. He served as Archbishop of Lyon from 1937 until his death, was Primate of Gaul and was elevated to the cardinalate in 1937.

Biography
Pierre-Marie Gerlier was born in Versailles, and was a lawyer before deciding to pursue an ecclesiastical career. Indeed, after attending the University of Bordeaux, he studied at the seminary in Issy for late vocations. Gerlier studied at the seminary in Fribourg before serving as an officer of the French Army in World War I, during which he was wounded and captured. Ordained to the priesthood on 29 July 1921, he then did pastoral work in Paris, where he was also the archdiocesan Director of Catholic Works.

On 14 May 1929 Gerlier was appointed Bishop of Tarbes and Lourdes by Pope Pius XI. He received his episcopal consecration on the following 2 July from Cardinal Louis-Ernest Dubois, with Bishops Benjamin Roland-Gosselin and Maurice Dubourg serving as co-consecrators, in Notre Dame Cathedral. Gerlier was named Archbishop of Lyon on 30 July 1937, and was created Cardinal-Priest of Ss. Trinità al Monte Pincio by Pope Pius in the consistory of 13 December that year. As Lyon's archbishop, he held the honorary title of Primate of Gaul. From 1945 to 1948, he served as Vice-President of the French Episcopal Conference.

During World War II, Gerlier condemned Pierre Laval's deportation of Jews to Nazi death camps, the severe conditions of which he also opposed. Moreover, he asked that Roman Catholic religious institutes take Jewish children into hiding. For his efforts to save Jews during World War II he was posthumously awarded the title Righteous among the Nations by Yad Vashem in 1981.

He was one of the cardinal electors in the 1939 papal conclave (at which he was considered papabile), which selected Pope Pius XII, and participated again in the 1958 conclave, which resulted in the election of Pope John XXIII. Living long enough to attend only the first three sessions of the Second Vatican Council, Gerlier was also a cardinal elector in the conclave of 1963 that chose Pope Paul VI.

The Cardinal died from a heart attack in Lyon, at age 85. He is buried in Lyon Cathedral.

Trivia
He championed the Worker-Priest movement and ecumenism, including endorsing the Taizé Community.
In 1950, Gerlier described the film Caroline chérie, starring French sex symbol Martine Carol, as "a scandalous display of vice".
He received Édouard Herriot's deathbed conversion to Catholicism in 1957.

See also
David Feuerwerker

References

External links
Cardinals of the Holy Roman Church
Catholic-Hierarchy
Pierre-Marie Gerlier at Yad Vashem website

1880 births
1965 deaths
People from Versailles
Archbishops of Lyon
Participants in the Second Vatican Council
Bishops of Tarbes
20th-century French cardinals
French military personnel of World War I
French Righteous Among the Nations
Catholic Righteous Among the Nations
Burials at Lyon Cathedral
Cardinals created by Pope Pius XI